Amir Mirza Hekmati; is a United States Marine veteran who was arrested in August 2011 for allegedly spying for the CIA in Iran. On January 9, 2012, he was sentenced to death for the charges. On March 5, 2012, the Iranian Supreme Court overturned the death sentence and ordered a retrial, saying the verdict against Hekmati was "not complete". On January 16, 2016, Hekmati was released and allowed to leave Iran as part of a prisoner trade between the U.S. and Iran. He returned to the United States on January 21, 2016. He sued the Government of Iran on May 11, 2016. He received a default judgment of $63 million on October 3, 2017. In November 2019 he sued the government for unpaid compensation.  According to the assistant attorney general they are reconsidering if he is eligible.

Early life and education
Hekmati was born in Flagstaff, Arizona; he has a twin sister, Leila. Hekmati's parents, Ali and Behnaz Hekmati, left Iran in 1979 during the Iranian Revolution and settled in Arizona, where Ali Hekmati finished a Ph.D. in microbiology.

The family moved to Lincoln, Nebraska and spent several years there before moving to Michigan, where Hekmati's father accepted a position as professor of microbiology at Mott Community College in Flint. The family lived in Flint and later Flint Township.

In August 2001, Hekmati enlisted in the U.S. Marine Corps. Amir completed his undergraduate degree in economics at the University of Michigan.

Career
Hekmati served in the U.S. Marine Corps from 20 August 2001 to 19 August 2005, when he was discharged as a Sergeant.  Hekmati completed recruit training at Marine Corps Recruit Depot San Diego, followed by the School of Infantry at Camp Pendleton, California, where he trained as a rifleman.   Amir also graduated from the Defense Language Institute having completed the Arabic Language course. He was awarded the Combat Action Ribbon while deployed as a rifleman, and translator in Iraq, but he received no military intelligence training.

After his discharge, Hekmati founded Lucid Linguistics LLC in February 2006 and worked as a military contractor translating Arabic and Persian.  Amir also developed a language, and cultural training app for the Department of Defense, that was later acquired by Vcom3d, and dubbed the Vcommunicator Mobile. Between 2005 and 2007 he is alleged to have worked on a report on two-way translation systems published by Mitre Corporation for the Defense Advanced Research Projects Agency (DARPA). He is cited in the "Acknowledgements" section of Applying Automated Metrics to Speech Translation Dialogs, a paper published by Mitre Corporation. He was later employed by Kuma Reality Games to work on a language-learning video game for the United States Department of Defense.

Between March and September 2010 Hekmati worked in Kansas for BAE Systems, a multinational defense contractor. Hekmati worked in Iraq between September 2010 and May 2011 as a culture and language expert. According to his parents, Ali and Behnaz Hekmati of Flint, Michigan, Hekmati travelled to Iran after obtaining permission from the Iranian Interests Section of the Embassy of Pakistan in Washington, D.C.

Espionage arrest and trial
In August 2011, Hekmati was arrested while visiting his grandmother and other relatives in Iran. According to his Iranian captors, Hekmati allegedly entered Iran from Bagram Airfield via Dubai. On 18 December 2011, a confession by Hekmati appeared on Iranian state television and stated that he had infiltrated Iran in order to establish a CIA presence in the country. Hekmati's family said that the confession was coerced, and that he was not a spy. The family is represented by a U.S. Attorney former Ambassador at Large Pierre-Richard Prosper.

Iran alleges that Hekmati's mission was to implicate the country in state-sponsored terrorist activities. On 24 December 2011, Switzerland, which manages diplomatic relations between Iran and the United States, applied for consular access to Hekmati. It was denied. In his confession, Hekmati stated that his mission pertained to maintaining a presence, rather than undermining the integrity of the country. According to excerpts from his alleged confession published in the Tehran Times, Hekmati said that Kuma Reality Games was paid by the CIA to design movies and video games to give the customers a distasteful impression of the Middle East.

Iranian officials claim that Hekmati underwent intelligence training after joining the U.S. military in 2001. They say he worked for the Defense Advanced Research Projects Agency between 2005 and 2007. Shortly before his mission to Iran, they claim he prepared at Bagram Airfield. An Iranian official attributed his recognition and capture to "Iranian networks monitoring activities in the Bagram base".

On 9 January 2012, Islamic Revolutionary Court declared Hekmati to be "Corrupt on Earth" (Mofsed-e-filarz) and an "enemy of God" (Mohareb). It sentenced him to death for cooperating with the United States.

Death sentence annulled
On 5 March 2012, Iran's Supreme Court  overturned the death sentence and ordered a retrial. The judges said the verdict against Hekmati was "not complete" and ordered a retrial. Hekmati awaited a retrial until  April 2014, when his sister announced that a secret court had again convicted him of "practical collaboration with the U.S. government" and sentenced him to 10 years in prison.

Calls for release
President Barack Obama repeatedly called upon Iran to release Hekmati as well as other U.S. citizens that were held prisoner, such as The Washington Post reporter Jason Rezaian and Christian pastor Saeed Abedini.

On May 11, 2015, the United States Senate unanimously passed, 90–0, a resolution calling upon the Iranian government to immediately release Hekmati, Abedini, and Rezaian, and to cooperate with the U.S. government to locate and return Robert Levinson, a retired FBI agent reported missing in Iran. The resolution also called upon the U.S. government to undertake every effort using every diplomatic tool at its disposal to secure their release.

Release
On January 16, 2016, Hekmati was released from Iran along with three other U.S. nationals held prisoner in Iran—Jason Rezaian, Saeed Abedini, and Nosratollah Khosravi-Roodsari—as part of an agreement between the U.S. and Iran. A fifth man, a recently detained student named Matthew Trevithick, was separately released.

After being freed, Hekmati departed Iran and traveled to Landstuhl Regional Medical Center, a U.S. military hospital in Germany, where he underwent a medical evaluation. Hekmati returned to his family in Flint on January 21, 2016.

Lawsuit
On May 11, 2016, Hekmati sued the Government of Iran for his ordeal, with charges of economic damages, compensatory damages, and punitive damages, claiming he was tortured, which included electric shock and forced drug withdrawal.

On October 3, 2017, U.S. District Court for the District of Columbia Judge Ellen S. Huvelle granted Hekmati a default judgment of $63 million.

Awards and decorations

See also
 List of foreign nationals detained in Iran

Notes

References

External links

 

Living people
1983 births
People from Flagstaff, Arizona
United States Marines
United States Marine Corps personnel of the Iraq War
American prisoners sentenced to death
Prisoners and detainees of Iran
Prisoners sentenced to death by Iran
American people imprisoned in Iran
People convicted of espionage in Iran
American people convicted of spying for the United States by the Islamic Republic of Iran
Flint Central High School alumni
American twins
University of Michigan alumni